The Sakhalin Regional Committee of the Communist Party of the Soviet Union, commonly referred to as the Sakhalin CPSU obkom, was the position of highest authority in the Sakhalin Oblast, in the Russian SFSR of the Soviet Union. The position was created in July 1925, and abolished in August 1991. The First Secretary was a de facto appointed position usually by the Politburo or the General Secretary himself.

List of First Secretaries of the Communist Party of Sakhalin

See also
Sakhalin Oblast

Notes

Footnote

Sources

Regional Committees of the Communist Party of the Soviet Union
Politics of Sakhalin Oblast
1925 establishments in the Soviet Union
1991 disestablishments in the Soviet Union